America Unearthed was an American entertainment television series, the first original series to air on the A&E Networks channel H2. The show premiered on December 21, 2012, and was produced by Committee Films of Minneapolis, Minnesota. The program was hosted by Minnesota-based geologist Scott Wolter, who investigates mysteries and artifacts believed to reveal an alternative history of the North American continent before the United States.

The show was cancelled following the sale of H2. The Travel Channel revived the series for ten episodes, again hosted by Wolter. The series broadcast in 2019 and was canceled after just one season.

The show has been described as entertaining but also has received criticism for promoting pseudohistory.

Predecessor
In September 2009, History Channel aired the two-hour special "Holy Grail in America", produced by Committee Films, which follows Scott Wolter as he explores the idea that the Kensington Runestone is evidence that the Knights Templar sailed to America about one hundred years before Columbus's voyage.

Reviewer Paul Mavis characterized "Holy Grail in America" as enjoyable pseudoscientific entertainment in the tradition of the 1970s television series In Search of.... Mavis noted that, "tellingly, the doc never presents any other geologists who have alternative theories about Wolter's findings" but concluded, "who cares if it's true or not? It's fun."

Reception
America Unearthed began airing on the H2 network in December 2012 The first episode, "American Maya Secrets", aired on the supposed end of the Mayan calendar and deals with a possible Mayan village in Georgia. The program was a success for the network, becoming  "the #1 series of all time on H2" and was subsequently approved for a second season with production starting in early 2013. The series had an average of 765,000 viewers in early 2013 and surpassed one million viewers in January 2013.

Episodes

Season 1 (2012–13)

Season 2 (2013–14)

Season 3 (2014–15)

Season 4 (2019)

References

External links 

2012 American television series debuts
H2 (A&E networks) original programming
Pseudohistory